For the Winter Olympics, there are 16 venues that have been or will be used for biathlon. Initially debuting in 1924 as military patrol, the event would debut on its own in 1960. Only three times in the Winter Olympics have the biathlon event has not been in the same cluster as cross-country skiing (1972, 1998, 2006).

References

Venues
 
Biathlon
Sport shooting-related lists